Tomales is a census-designated place (CDP) on State Route 1 in Marin County, California, United States. The population was 187 at the 2020 census.

Geography
The nearest city is Petaluma,  to the east by road, and the nearest large city is San Francisco, about 75 minutes to the south.

History
When Europeans first reached Tomales Bay, it was home to Coast Miwok people. Numerous authenticated Miwok villages are known from this area, including one (named Utumia) sited near the present-day town of Tomales.

The "Tomalles" post office opened in 1854, and changed its spelling to "Tomales" before 1879.

Starting in the 1870s, Tomales was a stop on the North Pacific Coast Railroad connecting Cazadero to the Sausalito ferry.

Built near the San Andreas Fault, Tomales was affected by the 1906 San Francisco earthquake. One of the town's two cemeteries predates the earthquake, and the damage to the pre-1906 plots shows just how widespread the quake's effects were.

Demographics

2010
At the 2010 census Tomales had a population of 204. The racial makeup of the CDP was 94.6% White, 1.5% Native American, 2.0% Asian, and 2.0% from two or more races. 4.4% of the population was Hispanic or Latino of any race.

The census reported that 100% of the population lived in households.

There were 99 households, 13 (13.1%) had children under the age of 18 living in them, 47 (47.5%) were opposite-sex married couples living together, 9 (9.1%) had a female householder with no husband present, 2 (2.0%) had a male householder with no wife present.  There were 10 (10.1%) unmarried opposite-sex partnerships, and 1 (1.0%) same-sex married couple or partnership. 32 households (32.3%) were one person and 6 (6.1%) had someone living alone who was 65 or older. The average household size was 2.06.  There were 58 families (58.6% of households); the average family size was 2.55.

The age distribution was 22 people (10.8%) under the age of 18, 12 people (5.9%) aged 18 to 24, 43 people (21.1%) aged 25 to 44, 93 people (45.6%) aged 45 to 64, and 34 people (16.7%) who were 65 or older.  The median age was 50.5 years. For every 100 females, there were 85.5 males.  For every 100 females age 18 and over, there were 80.2 males.

The homeowner vacancy rate was 1.6%; the rental vacancy rate was 7.0%. 61.8% of the population lived in owner-occupied housing units and 38.2% lived in rental housing units.

2000

At the 2000 census there were 210 people, 73 households, and 41 families in the CDP. The population density was 670/sq mi (262/km). The racial makeup of the CDP in 2010 was 90.2% non-Hispanic White, 1.5% Native American, 2.0% Asian, and 2.0% from two or more races. Hispanic or Latino of any race were 4.4%.

Of the 73 households 28.8% had children under the age of 18 living with them, 37.0% were married couples living together, 13.7% had a female householder with no husband present, and 43.8% were non-families. 28.8% of households were one person and 6.8% were one person aged 65 or older.  The average household size was 2.41 and the average family size was 3.10.

The age distribution was 22.4% under the age of 18, 3.8% from 18 to 24, 21.4% from 25 to 44, 41.9% from 45 to 64, and 10.5% 65 or older.  The median age was 46 years. For every 100 females, there were 90.9 males.  For every 100 females age 18 and over, there were 87.4 males.

The median household income was $51,953 and the median family income  was $52,708. Males had a median income of $41,607 versus $46,389 for females. The per capita income for the CDP was $26,609.  None of the families and 14.3% of the population were living below the poverty line, including no under eighteens and 14.3% of those over 64.

Education
Shoreline Unified School District operates Tomales Elementary School and Tomales High School. The high school is the largest employer in Tomales and has a student body of approximately 190 from northwest Marin County and southwest Sonoma County.

In popular culture
Much of the 2001 movie Bandits was filmed in and around Tomales, as were the opening shots of Mumford (1999), and parts of Scream (1996),  and Village of the Damned (1995).

References

External links
Tomales website

Census-designated places in Marin County, California
West Marin
Census-designated places in California